Cantharus septemcostatus is a species of sea snail, a marine gastropod mollusk in the family Pisaniidae, the true whelks.

Description

Distribution
This marine species occurs off New Caledonia
.

References

 Vermeij G.J. & Bouchet P. 1998. New Pisaniinae (Mollusca, Gastropoda, Buccinidae) from New Caledonia, with remarks on Cantharus and related genera. Zoosystema 20(3): 471-485

External links

Pisaniidae
Gastropods described in 1998